Bulbophyllum comberi is a species of orchid in the genus Bulbophyllum. The species was named for the orchidologist James Comber.

References
The Bulbophyllum-Checklist
The Internet Orchid Species Photo Encyclopedia

comberi